Anatoly Smiranin was a Soviet actor. He was People's Artist of the Georgian SSR.

Selected filmography 
 1944 — The Last Hill
 1946 — Robinzon Kruzo
 1961 — Amphibian Man
 1966 — The Game Without Draw

References

External links 
 Анатолий Смиранин on kino-teatr.ru

Soviet male film actors
1892 births
1971 deaths